The 1915 TCU Horned Frogs football team represented Texas Christian University (TCU) as a member of the Texas Intercollegiate Athletic Association during the 1915 college football season. Led by Ewing Y. Freeland in his first and only year as head coach, the Horned Frogs compiled an overall record of 4–5. TCU their home games in Fort Worth, Texas. The team's captain was John P. Cox, who played fullback. The school adopted the Horned Frogs nickname in the spring of 1915.

Schedule

References

TCU
TCU Horned Frogs football seasons
TCU Horned Frogs football